Zaclys is a genus of gastropods belonging to the family Cerithiopsidae.

The species of this genus are found in Australia and New Zealand.

Species:
 Zaclys clathrata (Angas, 1871) 
 Zaclys murdochi Marshall, 1978

References

Gastropod genera
Cerithiopsidae
Taxa named by Harold John Finlay